Daronch is a surname. Notable people with the surname include:

 Adílio Daronch (1908–1924), Brazilian murder victim
 Carol DaRonch (born 1956), abductee of Ted Bundy